The Daily Iowegian was a two-day (Tuesday and Friday) newspaper published in Centerville, Iowa and covering Appanoose and Wayne counties in Iowa and Putnam county in Missouri. It was owned by CNHI, LLC

The newspaper also published a Wednesday newspaper/shopper called Ad Express and has more than five times the circulation of the other days' papers.

The Daily Iowegian published its final edition on May 22, 2020, after announcing it was merging with the Ottumwa Courier.

History 

What is now known as the Daily Iowegian first published on April 7, 1883, as the "Industrial Iwegian." The moniker of the newspaper then was "A paper devoted to the interests of the industrial classes."

At the time it was founded, there were two other newspapers in the county: The Centerville Citizen (established in 1864) and the Centerville Journal.

Over the years, papers began consolidating. The Industrial Iwegian changed its name to the semi-weekly Iowegian. 

In 1916, the Centerville Citizen and semi-weekly Iowegian combined, creating the current newspaper known as the Daily Iowegian.

In 1983, Appanoose County Publishing purchased the Iowegian. They combined it with the Ad Express, a free shopper.

In 1999, Community Newspaper Holdings, Inc. purchased the Daily Iowegian and Ad Express.

The paper ceased publication and merged with Ottumwa Courier in May 2020.

References

External links 
 Ad Express and Daily Iowegian Website
 CNHI Website

 Digital Archives of over 30 Centerville newspapers, starting in 1850

Daily Iowegian
Daily Iowegian